The 1980 Hortico Melbourne Indoor Championships was an Association of Tennis Professionals men's tournament played on indoor carpet courts in the Frankston suburb of Melbourne, Victoria, Australia. It was the inaugural edition of the tournament, which was part of the  1980 Grand Prix tennis circuit, and was held from 20 October until 26 October 1980. First-seeded Vitas Gerulaitis won the singles title.

Finals

Singles
 Vitas Gerulaitis defeated  Peter McNamara 7–5, 6–3
 It was Gerulaitis's 3rd singles title of the year and the 18th of his career.

Doubles
 Fritz Buehning /  Ferdi Taygan defeated  John Sadri /  Tim Wilkison 6–1, 6–2

References

External links
 ITF tournament edition details

Hortico Melbourne Indoor Championships
Hortico Melbourne Indoor Championships, 1980
Hortico Melbourne Indoor Championships
Hortico Melbourne Indoor Championships